WUPR (1530 AM) is a radio station broadcasting a Spanish news/talk format. Licensed to Utuado, Puerto Rico, it serves the Puerto Rico area. The station is currently owned by Central Broadcasting Corporation and features programming from Red Informativa de PR.

History

WUPR was founded in April 4, 1964 by Benito Martinez. After the death of Benito Martinez in 1992 his son, Jose Martinez Giraud, assumed control of the station and changed its format from music-top 40 to music and news-talk.

Translator stations

External links

UPR
Radio stations established in 1964
1964 establishments in Puerto Rico
Utuado, Puerto Rico